Jeffrey Richman is an American writer, producer and actor.

Producer
 Uncoupled (2022): executive producer
 Modern Family: co-executive producer
 Stacked
 Frasier: executive producer
 Charlie Lawrence (2003): executive producer
 Stark Raving Mad (1999): co-executive producer
 Wings (1990): producer
 Rules of Engagement: co-executive producer

Writer
 Uncoupled:  3 episodes, 2022
 Modern Family
 Rules of Engagement: 4 episodes, 2009–10
 Back to You:  3 episodes, 2007-8
 Stacked:  2 episodes, 2005-6
 Jake in Progress: 1 episode, 2005
 Frasier
 Charlie Lawrence
 Wings
 The Jeffersons:  1 episode, 1982

Actor
Cheers (1989-1991)
Paper Dolls (1984)
Drop-Out Father (1982)
The Seduction (1982)
Pray TV (1980)
The Comedy Company (1978)

Personal life
Richman is openly gay. Since 2003, his partner is actor John Benjamin Hickey.

Awards and nominations
 Primetime Emmy: 1998 Outstanding Comedy Series for Frasier (1993).
 Nominated Primetime Emmy:  1999 and 2010

References

External links 

Living people
American male television actors
American television producers
American gay writers
Place of birth missing (living people)
Year of birth missing (living people)
American television writers
American male television writers
Primetime Emmy Award winners
20th-century American male actors
American LGBT screenwriters
LGBT producers